The 1999 Pocono 500 was a NASCAR Winston Cup Series race that took place on June 20, 1999, at Pocono Raceway in Long Pond, Pennsylvania.  This was the fifteenth race in the 1999 NASCAR Winston Cup Series schedule.

Background 
Pocono Raceway was built in 1969 with the first races run in 1971.  The first NASCAR race was run in 1974.  Pocono is a two-and-a-half mile triangular shaped racetrack with three distinct turns, all modeled after famous IndyCar tracks. Turn one has 14 degrees of banking and is modeled at the now-defunct Trenton Speedway.  The "Long Pond Straightaway" connects turns one and two.  Turn two, named "tunnel turn," has 9 degrees of banking and is modeled after the Indianapolis Motor Speedway.  Turn three has 6 degrees of banking and is modeled after the Milwaukee Mile.

Failed to qualify:  Hut Stricklin (#90), Loy Allen, Jr. (#58), Derrike Cope (#30)

Race report 
There were several hard crashes in this race. Rusty Wallace lost a tire on lap 7 and went straight into the turn one wall around 200 mph. Dave Marcis crashed heavily in turn two on lap 92, went up in the air, and was almost thrown from the car if not for the window net.  Both Waltrip brothers crashed in turn one late in the race, shortening up the rear ends of their cars.

Local favorite Jimmy Spencer had a great shot of winning his third Winston Cup race, taking the lead on lap 172.  However, on lap 185, Spencer went up the racetrack in the tunnel turn and hit the wall due to oil on the track.  He lost the lead to eventual winner Bobby Labonte and Spencer never recovered.

Timeline 

 Start:  Sterling Marlin leads the field to the green flag.
 Lap 3:  The first caution came out when Wally Dallenbach lost control in the short chute and spun out, collecting Jeff Burton who ended up hitting the wall.
 Lap 7:  Rusty Wallace blew a tire and went straight into the turn 1 wall at high speed, causing the second caution.
 Lap 47:  Chad Little spun out while entering pit road for a green flag pit stop.  He made contact with the pit wall and knocked several pieces of equipment.  No caution was thrown.
 Lap 70:  Third caution is flown for debris.
 Lap 92:  Dave Marcis crashed in the tunnel turn, causing the fourth caution.  It was one of the hardest hits ever seen at Pocono.  It was with such violence that Dave's helmet tried to come out of the window net.  Dave was shaken but uninjured.
 Lap 102:  Robert Pressley crashed in turn 1, causing the fifth caution.
 Lap 130:  Kenny Irwin slowed to avoid Terry Labonte, got turned from behind by Michael Waltrip, and spun out exiting turn 2, causing the sixth caution.
 Lap 148:  David Green stalled in turn 3, causing the seventh caution.
 Lap 154:  Michael Waltrip hit the wall very hard in turn 1, causing the eight caution. Ted Musgrave spun out in the aftermath. 
 Lap 167:  Steve Park ran into Darrell Waltrip, who crashed very hard in turn 1, causing the ninth caution.
 Lap 186:  Bill Elliott dropped oil on track, causing the ninth caution.
 Lap 194:  Ward Burton, Johnny Benson, and John Andretti crashed exiting turn 2, causing the 11th and final caution of the day.
 Lap 200:  Bobby Labonte takes the checkered flag.

Top 10 finishers

Post-race championship standings

References 

1999 NASCAR Winston Cup Series
1999 in sports in Pennsylvania
NASCAR races at Pocono Raceway